William H. Hare (May 13, 1853 – November 21, 1921) was an American politician in the state of Washington. He served in the Washington House of Representatives. From 1903 to 1905, he was the Speaker of that body.

References

Republican Party members of the Washington House of Representatives
1853 births
1921 deaths